Marty Burns, former child-star, general wise-ass and sometimes detective, is the fictional creation of Jay Russell. Marty made his debut in the novel Celestial Dogs (1996), working as yet another low-rent, Los Angeles detective.  The novel is a mix of hardboiled detective and supernatural horror, laced with heavy doses of humor and Hollywood in-jokes.   Marty has appeared in two subsequent novels - Burning Bright (1997) and Greed & Stuff (2001) - as well as a series of short stories  . His most recent literary appearance was in the novella Apocalypse Now, Voyager (2005).

Burns, Marty